The Sweetener Sessions (officially American Express x Ariana Grande: The Sweetener Sessions in the United States, and Capital Up Close Presents Ariana Grande in the United Kingdom) was a promotional tour by American singer Ariana Grande, in support of her fourth studio album Sweetener (2018). It began on August 20, 2018, in New York City, United States and ended on September 4, 2018, in London, England.

Background
Three performances took place at New York City's Irving Plaza, The Vic Theatre in Chicago, and Los Angeles' Ace Theater between August 20 and 25, 2018, following the release of her studio album Sweetener.

Tickets for the intimate shows were made available exclusively to American Express cardholders. 

The New York City concert occurred after her appearance at the 2018 MTV Video Music Awards, where she performed "God Is a Woman".

On August 28, 2018, a London concert was announced in partnership with Capital Up Close. Tickets to the show were not available for purchase, instead Capital listeners could win tickets in competition rounds.

Set lists

Shows

Reception
The Guardians Caroline Sullivan rated the London show four out of five stars.

References 

2018 concert tours
Ariana Grande concert tours
August 2018 events in the United States
September 2018 events in the United Kingdom